Daniel Owen (1732 – October 21, 1812) was a politician and judge in the state of Rhode Island. He served as lieutenant governor of the State of Rhode Island from May 1786 to May 1790, and was an associate justice of the Rhode Island Supreme Court from May 1790 to May 1791, and Chief Justice from May 1791 to June 1795.

Born in Providence, Rhode Island, Owen was the son of Thomas Owen, who had been a deputy of the general assembly of Rhode Island in 1770, and assistant deputy to Governor Stephen Hopkins. Owen settled in Glocester, Rhode Island, where he was "admitted a freeman" in May 1757.

According to The National Cyclopedia of American Biography:

Owen's children included daughter Amey; she was the wife of first William Gadcomb, and then Asa Aldis, who served as chief justice of the Vermont Supreme Court. Her daughter with Gadcomb, Fidelia, was the wife of Senator Lawrence Brainerd.  Her son with Aldis, Asa O. Aldis, also served on the Vermont Supreme Court.

References

1732 births
1812 deaths
People from Glocester, Rhode Island
Chief Justices of the Rhode Island Supreme Court
Lieutenant Governors of Rhode Island
People of colonial Rhode Island
Politicians from Providence, Rhode Island